Ustupu-Ogobsucum Airport  is an airport serving the island town of Ustupo in the Guna Yala comarca (indigenous province) of Panama. It handles domestic flights and general aviation.

The runway bridges two of the several islands comprised by the town. It is
 northwest of the main populated islands. Approach and departure at either end of the runway will be over the water.

Airlines and destinations

The airport is served by Air Panama by flights every second day, offering return flights to Panama City. The island often floods during the monsoon season causing flight cancellations.

Incidents and accidents
 On 28 January 2007, a Cessna 182 operating a cargo flight was destroyed after it crashed into trees during take-off from the airport.

See also

Transport in Panama
List of airports in Panama

References

External links
OpenStreetMap - Ustupu
OurAirports - Ogubsucum Airport
Air Panama

Airports in Panama
Guna Yala